III is an album by Moistboyz, released in 2002 by Ipecac Recordings. Exclaim! wrote that "each track is a laser guided guitar riff masterpiece."

Track listing
All tracks written by Moistboyz.

 "Shitheel" – 2:13
 "I Am the Reaper" – 2:15
 "In the Valley of the Sun" – 3:15
 "The Tweaker" – 3:15
 "The Spike" – 3:09
 "Five Time Loser" – 3:21
 "Great American Zero" – 2:21
 "I'm Gonna Kick Your Ass" – 1:54
 "Black Train" – 3:32
 "The Walker" – 3:41

References

Moistboyz albums
2002 albums
Ipecac Recordings albums